Route 40, known as   in Icelandic or by its busiest stretch, is one of the two major traffic arteries running across Capital Region.

References

Roads in Iceland